Zokhawthar is a border town in the Champhai district of Mizoram state of India. It is located in the Khawzawl R.D. Block, on the India–Myanmar border, near the Rih Dil lake. 

Khawmawi village and Rikhawdar on the Myanmar side are the accessible via a bridge over the Harhva river.

Demographics 

According to the 2011 census of India, Zokhawthar has 501 households. The effective literacy rate (i.e. the literacy rate of population excluding children aged 6 and below) is 93.58%.

Transport and border connectivity 

India is part of BIMSTEC, East Asia Summit, Mekong-Ganga Cooperation, United Nations Economic and Social Commission for Asia and the Pacific, Asian Highway Network and the Trans-Asian Railway network and India has embarked on several Look-East connectivity projects.

Mizoram has unfenced international border with Myanmar (404 km) guarded by Border Security Force (BSF) and Bangladesh (318 km) guarded by Assam Rifles. India and Myanmar has set up 4 Border Haats (markets) in Mizoram at Hnahlan, Zote, Vaphai (Saikhumphai) and Sangau (Pangkhua) to boost the local trade and economy. Indian has set up 5 ICP (Integrated Check Posts) Mizoram at Kawrpuichhuah, Marpara, Tuipuibari, Silsuri and Nunsury.

Border checkpost, customs and immigration 

Zokhawthar LCS (Land Custom Station), was opened on the Indo-Myanmar border in August 2018. It is one of the two such check-posts in the state of Mizoram. There is a proposal to upgrade it to ICP (Integrated Check Point) entailing immigration and customs both.

Airport and railway 

Lengpui Airport in Aizawl (242 km northwest of Moreh) is the nearest airport in India. Sairang railhead of Bairabi–Sairang line is the nearest railway station.

AH1 and India-Thailand Highway

India plans to upgrade route from Zokhawthar in Mizoram to Tedim in Chin State of Myanmar as an additional connect to the India–Myanmar–Thailand Trilateral Highway (IMT), which is part of Asian Highway Network and Asian Highway 1 (AH1) passes through Moreh in Manipur. Zokhawthar-Tedim connectivity to IMT will provide an alternate route to the existing route via Moreh.

See also 

 Borders of India

References 

Villages in Khawzawl block
India–Myanmar border crossings